Minna of Worms (died in May 1096) was a Jewish businesswoman and martyr. She was an influential Jew, being a significant moneylender with clients and friends among the Christian nobility. Minna was one of the most famous victims of the 1096 Worms massacre which occurred during the First Crusade. She was murdered for refusing conversion to Christianity.

References 

 

11th-century German women
11th-century German Jews
People of the First Crusade
1096 deaths
Jewish martyrs
Medieval Jewish women
German murder victims
11th-century crime
Medieval businesswomen
11th-century businesspeople
Medieval bankers
Medieval German merchants